Errekalde is a railway station in San Sebastián, Basque Country, Spain. It is owned by Euskal Trenbide Sarea and operated by Euskotren. It lies on the Bilbao-San Sebastián line and is also served by the suburban Topo service.

History 
The station opened in 1895 as part of the San Sebastián-Zarautz stretch of the San Sebastián-Elgoibar railway. The current station opened in 2012, as part of the complete renovation and doubling of the line between Añorga and Usurbil.

Services 
The station is served by Euskotren Trena lines E1 and E2. Line E2 runs every 15 minutes (in each direction) during weekdays, and every 30 minutes during weekends. Line E1 runs every 30 minutes (in each direction) during weekdays, and every hour during weekends.

References

External links
 

Euskotren Trena stations
Railway stations in San Sebastián
Railway stations in Spain opened in 1895
Railway stations in Spain opened in 2012
2012 establishments in the Basque Country (autonomous community)